The underarm is the area below the arm.

Underarm, underarms etc. may also refer to:

Under arms, a state of military readiness
Underarm bowling, a bowling style in cricket
Underarms and Sideways, a 2005 compilation album by The Hope Blist

See also
Underhand